The Mixed relay competition at the Biathlon World Championships 2021 was held on 10 February 2021.

Results
The race was started at 15:00.

References

Mixed relay
Mixed sports competitions